Aigel (also Romanized as Āīgel, Īgel, Āīgal, and Īgol) is a village in Rudbar-e Qasran Rural District, Rudbar-e Qasran District, Shemiranat County, Tehran Province, Iran. At the 2006 census, its population was 421, in 131 families.

References 

Populated places in Shemiranat County